Kubizek may refer to:

August Kubizek (1888–1956), close friend of Adolf Hitler
Augustin Kubizek (1918–2009), Austrian choir conductor and composer